Zürich Altstetten railway station is a railway station in the Altstetten quarter of the Swiss city of Zürich. The station is located on the Zürich to Olten main line and is the junction for the Zürich to Zug via Affoltern am Albis line.

It is also a calling point for the hourly InterRegio services that link Basel to Zurich Airport via Zürich Hauptbahnhof, and Bern to Zürich via Olten.

The station is well connected to the ZVV network, with bus and tram stops on both sides of the station. Since 2022 the station also serves as the eastern terminus of the Limmattal light rail line.

History 
The first station on the site was built by the Swiss Northern Railway in 1847, as part of their pioneering line from Zurich to Baden, and hence was one of the first railway stations in Switzerland. Over time, this line became today's Zürich to Olten main line and the principal rail route between Zürich and northern and western Switzerland. The Zürich to Zug via Affoltern am Albis line opened in 1864, making Altstetten into a junction station. In 1907, the Swiss Federal Railways, who had taken over both lines, opened a workshop near the station.

Operation

Rail Services 
The station has one side platform and two island platforms, served by five tracks, and has station buildings and entrances on both the north and south sides of the station. The platforms and entrances are connected by a pair of pedestrian subways.

The track 1 is built very close to the station building, in pedestrian area, as a light rail track (embedded into pavement). It is not used during normal operations. The numbers of tracks actually in use start from 2. The track 5 has no platform. It is only used for the passing trains that do not stop at this station.

S-Bahn 
For most of the day, the following regional services of the Zürich S-Bahn are provided:
 
 
 
 
 
 

During weekends, there are also two Nighttime S-Bahn services (SN1, SN5) offered by ZVV.

InterRegio 
Additionally there are single InterRegio (IR) trains per hour that call at Altstetten in both directions.
 : Between  and Bern via Olten (operated by SOB and SBB CFF FFS).
 : Between Zurich Airport and Basel SBB (operated by SBB CFF FFS).

Local tram and bus services 
There are two stations with tram and bus services. Bhf. Altstetten Nord is located north to the railway station, while Bahnhof Altstetten is situated south of the station. Route 4 of the Zürich tram system serves the Bhf. Altstetten Nord station, whilst route 31 of the Zürich trolleybus system passes the south side of the station (Bahnhof Altstetten). Zürich bus routes 35, 78, 80, 83, 89 and 485 also serve the south side of the station, whilst routes 304 and 307 both terminate at Bhf. Altstetten Nord.

Since December 2022, the Limmattal light rail line (route 20) terminates at Bahnhof Altstetten station. The light rail line has its own platforms, across the station plaza from platform two of the S-Bahn services. This service, operated by AVA, runs through the Limmat Valley region and connects to the Zürich tram network at Farbhof, just to the west of Altstetten station.

Summary of tram and bus services:
Bhf.

Gallery

References

External links 

 Station data from SBB web page
 Station plan from SBB web page

Swiss Federal Railways stations
Altstetten
Railway stations in Switzerland opened in 1847